The The Affiliated Keelung Maritime Senior High School of National Taiwan Ocean University is a high school in Keelung,Taiwan, affiliated to National Taiwan Ocean University.

See also
 Education in Taiwan
 National Taiwan Ocean University

References

Schools in Keelung
High schools in Taiwan